The Beckoning Trail is a 1916 American silent Western film directed by Jack Conway and starring J. Warren Kerrigan, Lois Wilson and Maude George.

Cast
 J. Warren Kerrigan as Carter Raymond 
 Maude George as Georgette Fallon 
 Harry Carter as 'Placer' Murray 
 Harry Griffith as 'Big Jim' Helton 
 Lois Wilson as Mary Helton 
 Ray Hanford as Dodd

References

External links
 

1916 films
1916 Western (genre) films
American black-and-white films
1910s English-language films
Films directed by Jack Conway
Silent American Western (genre) films
Universal Pictures films
1910s American films